The Layton Bridge is a Pratt truss bridge over the Youghiogheny River in Layton, Pennsylvania. Originally built for the Washington Run Railroad, construction began 1893 and was completed in 1899. The last train crossed in 1931. The bridge and a tunnel immediately to its south were converted to a single automobile lane in 1933 as part of a road that connects Layton with Perryopolis, near the suspected location of the eighteenth-century Spark's Fort.

The bridge has not been painted in recent years and its members are now corroded.

Arts and Media
The bridge was filmed as part of "Fire in the Hole", the pilot episode of the television series "Justified", and was seen in the movie The Silence of the Lambs. The Layton Bridge was also featured in the 2021 movie Sweet Girl.

References

External links

[ National Register nomination form]

Road bridges on the National Register of Historic Places in Pennsylvania
Bridges completed in 1899
Railroad bridges on the National Register of Historic Places in Pennsylvania
Bridges in Fayette County, Pennsylvania
Former railway bridges in the United States
1899 establishments in Pennsylvania
National Register of Historic Places in Fayette County, Pennsylvania
Bridges over the Youghiogheny River
Steel bridges in the United States
Pratt truss bridges in the United States